Latvia competed at the 2011 World Championships in Athletics from August 27 to September 4 in Daegu, South Korea.

Team selection
A team of 15 athletes was announced to represent the country in the event. The team is led by javelin thrower Vadims Vasiļevskis, the 2004 Olympic Games silver medalist and second this year’s world rankings with 88.22m, and 2010 European Athletics Championships long jump gold medalist Ineta Radēviča. Māris Urtāns and Edgars Eriņš were both qualified and appeared on the entry list, but they won't compete due to injuries.

The following athletes appeared on the preliminary Entry List, but not on the Official Start List of the specific event, resulting in a total number of 13 competitors:

Medalists
The following competitor from Latvia won a medal at the Championships

Results

Men

Women

Heptathlon

References

External links
Official local organising committee website
Official IAAF competition website

Nations at the 2011 World Championships in Athletics
World Championships in Athletics
Latvia at the World Championships in Athletics